MFY is Music for Youth, a British charity for young musicians.

MFY may also refer to:

 Mayo language, spoken in Mexico (by ISO 639 code)
 Mayfa'ah Airport, Yemen (by IATA code)